Filippo Anastasio (1656–1735) was a Roman Catholic prelate who served as Titular Patriarch of Antioch (1724–1735) and Archbishop of Sorrento (1699–1724).

Biography
Filippo Anastasio was born in Amalfi, Italy on 27 January 1656.
On 11 April 1699, he was appointed during the papacy of Pope Innocent XII as Archbishop of Sorrento.
On 12 April 1699, he was consecrated bishop by Domenico Belisario de Bellis, Bishop of Molfetta, with Placido Scoppa, Bishop of Venosa, and Tommaso Guzzoni, Bishop of Sora,  serving as co-consecrators. 
He resigned as Archbishop of Sorrento on 13 December 1724.
On 20 December 1724, he was appointed during the papacy of Pope Benedict XIII as Titular Patriarch of Antioch.
He served as Titular Patriarch of Antioch until his death on 11 May 1735.

Episcopal succession
While bishop, he was the principal consecrator of:
Ludovico Agnello Anastasio, Archbishop of Sorrento (1724);
Giulio de Turris, Bishop of Ruvo (1731); and
Giovanni Antonio Chiaiese, Bishop of Mottola (1731);

References

External links and additional sources
 (for Chronology of Bishops) 
 (for Chronology of Bishops)  
 (for Chronology of Bishops) 
 (for Chronology of Bishops) 

18th-century Italian Roman Catholic archbishops
Bishops appointed by Pope Innocent XII
Bishops appointed by Pope Benedict XIII
1656 births
1735 deaths